David Fraser Thomas (born January 1963) is a British businessman. He is the chief executive of the housebuilder Barratt Developments.

Early life
Thomas was born in January 1963. He has a degree from the University of Strathclyde, and is a chartered accountant.

Career
Thomas was deputy CEO and finance director of Game Group from 2007 to 2009.

Thomas was finance director of Barratt since July 2009, when he took over from Mark Clare, who had been CEO for nine years, in July 2015.

Thomas has been CEO of Barratt since 2015. In 2021, he was paid £3.7 million.

References

1963 births
Living people
Alumni of the University of Strathclyde
British accountants
British chief executives
Barratt Developments people